Kotkan Työväen Palloilijat (abbreviated as KTP) is a Finnish football club based in Kotka, Finland, and currently competing in Finland's premier league, Veikkausliiga. The club was founded in 1927 and its colours are green and white. Immediately after its formation the club joined the Finnish Workers' Sports Federation, to which it still belongs. KTP play its home matches at Arto Tolsa Areena.

History
KTP had a long football traditions centred on its golden age in the early 1950s when the club won two Finnish championships in 1951 and 1952. They also won the Finnish Cup four times, the most recent occasion being in 1980. The club, playing in the renamed Arto Tolsa Areena, were participating in the Veikkausliiga as recently as 2000, but were relegated to Ykkönen and finally went into bankruptcy. The club re-formed and played in the lower divisions before gaining promotion to the Kakkonen in 2007. They spent two seasons in the Kakkonen but were relegated in 2009. In 2010, the club are playing in the Kolmonen and was promoted to Kakkonen where they played 2011–2013.

Season 2014, KTP finished second in Ykkönen, and promoted to Finnish top league Veikkausliiga in season 2015. However, after a difficult 2015 Veikkausliiga season, club finished 11th in the league, and had to play a promotion play-off against PK-35. After two disappointing performances, the club lost on aggregate 3–2, and were relegated back to Ykkönen.

The all-time Championship appearances and leading goal scorer of KTP is Arto Tolsa with 126 goals in 201 matches.

Formation of FC KTP
During December 2013 a merger took place, as part of which FC KooTeePee adopted the name of FC Kotkan Työväen Palloilijat. As of the 2014 season the merged club were allowed to retain FC KooTeePee's place in the Ykkönen.

Supporters and rivalries
KTP is one of the most supported clubs in Finland. Closest rival is MYPA. Distance between cities is little over 30 kilometres. However, when MYPA went to bankrupt, clubs have not faced each other for many years. During December 2017 and January 2018, KTP sold 2273 season tickets, which is the all-time record in the Finnish First Division.

Stadium

The home venue of the KTP is Arto-Tolsa Arena. It was opened in 1952 and was known as the Kotkan Urheilukeskus, but in 2000 the full renovation of the stadium, name was changed to the Arto Tolsa Arena. At the beginning of the 2015 season, the pitch was converted to an artificial playing surface.

Honours

European campaign
KTP have played in Europe on one occasion in the Cup Winners' Cup in the 1981–82 season, having won the Finnish Cup in 1980.

Divisional Movements since 1930
Top Level (25 seasons): 1948–58, 1963–69, 1979–83, 1999–2000, 2015
Second Level (15 seasons): 1943/44, 1959–62, 1970–72, 1978, 1984, 1994–98, 2014, 2016, 2018-
Third Level (16 seasons): 1973–77, 1985–93, 2008–09, 2011–2013, 2017
Fourth Level (7 seasons): 2002–07, 2010
Fifth Level (1 season): 2001

Season to season

Club records
 Most Championship (SM-sarja) matches: Arto Tolsa, 201 games between 1963 and 1981
 Most goals in Championship (SM-sarja): Arto Tolsa, 126 goals in the years 1963–1981
 Most goals in one season in Championship (SM-sarja) league matches: Arto Tolsa, 26 goals in season 1964
 Home Match attendance record: 6,325 spectators in a match in 1981 against Kuopion Pallotoverit
 Biggest win a Championship (SM-sarja) match: 8–0 home to Valkeakosken Haka in 1952
 Biggest defeat in a Championship (SM-sarja) match: 1–8 away to Turun Palloseura in 1969

Attendances since 1994

Current squad

First Team Managers since 1980

References

External links
KTP Official Website
Finnish Wikipedia
Suomen Cup
KTP Fans Forum

Football clubs in Finland
Tyovaen Palloilijat
1927 establishments in Finland